The 1961 Copa de Campeones de América was the second season of the competition, South America's prized football tournament. Nine teams entered, two more than the previous season, with Venezuela not sending a representative. In order to further enhance the competition, CONMEBOL maintained the criteria of having regional clashes in order to take advantage of the cross-border rivalries

Although Peñarol also won their national league, this became the first and, so far, only time the defending champions did not qualify automatically to the next edition. Nevertheless, the Manyas successfully defended their title by defeating Palmeiras in the final.

Qualified teams

Format 
Each match-up was a two-team group stage. Because of the increase in participants, a preliminary group was implemented in the competition, with the rest following the previous season's format. Wins were awarded two points, 1 point for a draw, and no points for a loss. The team with the most points after a home and away game advanced to the next stage.

If the teams still remained tied, goal difference will become a factor. A one-game playoff would be implemented in case the teams are still tied. A draw of lots was to become the last solution to breaking a tie. Controversially, Independiente Santa Fe and Jorge Wilstermann tied on points which would have required a playoff; CONMEBOL, however, scrapped the idea and decided that the last semifinal slot was to be given by a draw of lots which the Colombians won.

Tournament bracket

Preliminary round

First round

Group 1 

Olimpia drew 2–2 with Colo-Colo on point aggregate. Olimpia progressed to the semifinals due to better goal difference.

Group 2 

Peñarol drew 2–2 with Universitario on point aggregate. Peñarol progressed to the semifinals due to better goal difference.

Group 3

Group 4 

Independiente Santa Fe drew 2–2 with Jorge Wilstermann on point aggregate and goal difference. No playoff was disputed to determine the winner. Independiente Santa Fe progressed to the semifinals after a draw of lots.

Semifinals
Four teams were drawn into two groups of two teams each. In each group, teams played against each other home and away. The top team in each group advanced to the Finals.

Group A

Group B

Finals

Champion

Top goalscorers

References

External links 
1961 Copa Libertadores at RSSSF

1
Copa Libertadores seasons